Edson José da Silva (born 9 May 1986), or simply Edson Silva, is a Brazilian professional footballer who plays as a central defender for Novorizontino.

He previously played five consecutive seasons with São Paulo in the Campeonato Brasileiro Série A.

Honours
São Paulo
Copa Sudamericana (1): 2012

Red Star
 Serbian SuperLiga (1): 2015–16

Londrina
 Primeira Liga (1): 2017

External links
 zerozero.pt

References

1986 births
Living people
Brazilian footballers
Brazilian expatriate footballers
Campeonato Brasileiro Série A players
Campeonato Brasileiro Série B players
Serbian SuperLiga players
Expatriate footballers in Serbia
Association football defenders
Villa Rio Esporte Clube players
Sport Club Corinthians Alagoano players
Clube de Regatas Brasil players
Botafogo de Futebol e Regatas players
Fortaleza Esporte Clube players
Duque de Caxias Futebol Clube players
Figueirense FC players
São Paulo FC players
Red Star Belgrade footballers
Mirassol Futebol Clube players
Londrina Esporte Clube players